That's No Way to Land a Man is a 1959 West German comedy film directed by Hans Deppe and starring Grethe Weiser, Karin Dor and Karin Baal.
It was shot at the Göttingen Studios. The film's sets were designed by the art director Willi Herrmann.

Cast
 Grethe Weiser as Elsbeth Müller
 Karin Dor as Tessy
 Karin Baal as Monika
 Sabine Eggerth as Angela
 Erik Schumann as Stefan Reimer
 Peter Vogel as Fritz Becker
 Bruno Fritz as Wilhelm Böckelmann
 Erica Beer as Vera Reinhardt
 Walter Giller as Anton Scheufele
 Fritz Rémond Jr. as Opernsänger Müller
 Walter Ambrock as Günther Arnold
 Michael Verhoeven as Horst Burkhardt
 Ruth Nimbach as Fräulein Stenzel
 Willi Rose as Trainer
 Carlos Miranda as Sänger
 Ivo Carraro as Sänger

References

Bibliography 
 Hans-Michael Bock and Tim Bergfelder. The Concise Cinegraph: An Encyclopedia of German Cinema. Berghahn Books, 2009.

External links 
 

1959 films
1959 comedy films
German comedy films
West German films
1950s German-language films
Films directed by Hans Deppe
1950s German films
Films shot at Göttingen Studios